Baron Jean Joseph Edouard Pycke d'Ideghem (11 December 1807 – 27 April 1892) was a Belgian liberal politician. He was governor of the province of Antwerp from 5 April 1862 until 23 March 1887.

Political career
Edouard Pycke was a member of the Antwerp provincial council for the Canton Mechelen from 5 July 1842 until 25 May 1846 and from 18 July 1848 until 5 April 1846. He was a deputy to the provincial council from 4 August 1848 until 5 April 1862.

References

1807 births
1892 deaths
Governors of Antwerp Province
People from Antwerp Province